Gurdwara Sri Guru tegh Bahadur Sahib is the Gurdwara of Sikhs in Dhubri town on the bank of the Brahmaputra River in Assam, India. The first Sikh guru, Guru Nanak Dev, visited this place in 1505 AD and met Srimanta Sankardeva on his way when he traveled from Dhaka to Assam. Later, the 9th Guru Teg Bahadur came to this place and established this Gurdwara during the 17th century. More than 50,000 Hindus, Sikhs, Muslims and all faiths devotees from all over the country and the world assemble in this historic shrine every year in December to mark the martyrdom of Guru Tegh Bahadur. The festival starts on 3 December with great solemnity and ceremony. Sikhs call this festival Sahidee-Guru-Parav.

History 

In 1669 AD Raja Ram Singh, Mughal general of Amber was deputed by Aurangzeb of Delhi to crush a rebellion by the Ahom king Chakradhwaj Singha. But Assam was a difficult country for such an operation and Raja Ram Singh requested Guru Teg Bahadur to accompany him. Guru Teg Bahadur approved the request; his presence was initially thought to be a morale booster to Ram Singh and his troops. However, later Guru's role was proved to be much more crucial than his mere presence. This operation was actually a punishment for Ram Singh because it was from his custody that Shivaji and his son had escaped, from Aurangzeb's likely execution, a few years earlier. 

On arrival to Kamrup early in February 1669 AD, Guru Tegh Bahadur camped at Dhubri while Raja Ram Singh and his army camped at Rangamati Fort. Though the Imperial Army was confident but still not sure whether the holy man with them would be able to destroy the evil effects of magic and witchcraft of the Assamese. Across the river, the Assamese were unnerved by the superior numbers of the Imperial Army, but they were confident that the supernatural powers of their magicians would keep the attackers at bay. 

The Assamese women magicians with their tantric paraphernalia began reciting mantras of destruction in their encampment directly across the river of the camp of Guru Tegh Bahadur. But all their magical effects failed to harm him. The magicians were overconfident of their ability to destroy any human. From across the river they hurled a 26-foot-long stone, which came arcing across the sky like a missile and struck the ground, near the guru's camp, so hard that nearly half of its length was embedded in the ground. It can still be seen in the same position. 

When their missile failed to harm the guru, the magicians next flung a tree, which fell very close to the camp without causing injury. Then, as Guru Tegh Bahadur took his bow and aimed an arrow at the altar of magic, all of their magic and sorcery came to a sudden end. The magicians realized that superior powers had completely deprived them of their magical strengths and blocked their willpower. They crossed the river to the guru's camp and begged forgiveness for having offended him. They told him that they were fighting only to repel the foreigners who had come to enslave them.

Guru Tegh Bahadur assured the magicians that he would work to bring peace between Raja Ram Singh and the Ahom King, for which a change of heart was necessary on both sides. Consequently, he advised Raja Ram Singh to achieve his ruler's objectives through peaceful negotiations and not to fight unless he was attacked. The rest of the story is a part of the history as to how he succeeded in patching up the differences between the imperial commander Raja Ram Singh and the Ahom king of Assam. The grateful Ahom king invited Guruji to the Kamakhya shrine, where he was honoured with great respect.

The happy occasion of the peace settlement brought about by the efforts of Guru Tegh Bahadur was celebrated by a joint homage to the shrine of Guru Nanak by the Mughal and Ahom armies. The mound of peace of Dhubri was erected with the red earth carried by the soldiers of the armies on their shields. This permanent monument to Guru Tegh Bahadur's successful peace efforts stands at Dhubri to this day. Pilgrims from all over India visit Dhubri to pay homage at Gurdwara Damdama Sahib. They also visit the mound of peace constructed by Hindu and Muslim soldiers of the two armies.

The Janamsakhis are unanimous about Guru Nanak Dev's visit to Kamrup (Assam) but no sangat or historical shrine dedicated to him survives.

Guru Tegh Bahadur visited Assam in 1669. . Guru Tegh Bahadur's presence, therefore, was a moral booster to both him and his troops. The Guru's role, however, proved to be much more essential to the results than his mere presence. Pacifist that the famed Guru was, his efforts were essential in the peace agreement concluded between the former enemies.

As a monument to peace, a high mound was raised to which every soldier contributed five shieldfuls of earth. This mound standing on the right bank of the Brahmapra River at Dhubri, a sub-divisional town in Goalpara district of Assam, came to be treated as a sacred shrine. A Gurdwara was also built near it on the spot where Guru Tegh Bahadur had stayed and negotiated peace. It was looked after by Udasi priests until it was destroyed in an earthquake around 1896–97. Bhai Ram Singh, an officiant of the shrine, reconstructed a room in 1901. The Mahants, originally, possessed a farman (fiat) of a Mughal emperor pertaining to a land grant to the shrine. In 1902–03, Mahant Jai Singh took this Farman with him when he went to Punjab to raise funds through donations for the Gurdwara building under reconstruction. Unfortunately Bhai Jai Singh died on this trip somewhere near Amritsar, and the Farman was lost.

There are two Gurdwaras located here:

 Gurdwara Thara Sahib or Damdama Sahib: In 1966, a gurdwara in a small octagonal hut with sloping roof was also set up on top of the mound. It is called Thara Sahib or Damdama Sahib.
 'Gurdwara Sri Guru Tegh Bahadur Sahib: The other shrine is in a square hall with wooden walls and sloping roof. Further development of the gurdwara is afoot under the Sikh Pratinidhi Board Eastern Zone and the local managing committee.

Transportation
To reach Dhubri, the rail route, via Katihar and Siliguri, is convenient. One has to change trains (or direction) at Fakiragram junction for Dhubri, a distance of about 70 kilometres by rail or road.

Historical visitors 

Former Indian President Gyani Zail Singh visited this holy shrine in 1983 AD.

References 

 Sharma, B. K.;  The Telegraph, India, 29 May 2008.
 Rashid, P. The Tribune Windows, India, 19 April 2003 

Gurdwaras in India
Dhubri
Religious buildings and structures in Assam
17th-century gurdwaras